Keith Lehrer (born January 10, 1936) is Emeritus Regent's Professor of philosophy at the University of Arizona and a research professor of philosophy at the University of Miami, where he spends half of each academic year.

Education and career

Lehrer received his PhD in philosophy from Brown University where he studied under Richard Taylor and Roderick Chisholm.  He joined the faculty at the University of Arizona in 1973, where he helped build a major graduate program.  Prior to that, he taught at the University of Rochester.

His research interests include epistemology, free will, rational consensus, Thomas Reid and, recently, aesthetics.

Lehrer is a former president of the Pacific Division of the American Philosophical Association (APA) and also served as the APA executive director for a number of years.  He is an elected Fellow of the American Academy of Arts and Sciences.

Lehrer, and his wife Adrienne Lehrer, are also artists. Their work has been on display at the Vincent Gallery in Coconut Grove, Florida, concurrent with his stay at the University of Miami, where he was a visiting professor.

Philosophical work

Lehrer is best known for his defense of a coherentist theory of knowledge.  According to Lehrer, "a person is justified in accepting a proposition just in case that proposition coheres with the relevant part of her cognitive system."

Lehrer's work, "Why Not Skepticism?" is used in many introductory philosophy courses as a coherent and readable introduction to the subject. He has authored seven books on philosophical subjects, and over 170 scholarly articles. Lehrer is perhaps best known for his defense of the coherence theory of justification in epistemology. He is the originator of the widely discussed TrueTemp example.

Selected publications
 Books
 Art, Self, and Knowledge (Oxford, 2011)
 Self Trust: A Study of Reason, Knowledge and Autonomy (Oxford, 1997)
 Philosophical Problems and Arguments: An Introduction (Hackett, 1992, 4th ed.), with James Cornman and George Pappas
 Metamind (Oxford, 1990)
 Theory of Knowledge (Westview, 1990)
 Thomas Reid (Routledge, 1989)
 Rational Consensus in Science and Society: A Philosophical and Mathematical Study (D. Reidel, 1981), with Carl Wagner
 Knowledge (Oxford, 1974)

 Recent articles

 "Love and Autonomy," in a volume Love Analyzed, ed. R. Lamb, Westview Press, 1997.
 "Semantic Fields and Vectors of Meaning," with Adrienne Lehrer, In Lexical Semantics, Cognition and Philosophy, B. Lewandowska-Tomaszcyzyk, Lødz University Press, 1998.
 "Meaning, Exemplarization and MEtarepresentation," written for Metarepresentation, Dan Sperber ed., a volume of Vancouver Studies in Cognitive Science.
 "Acceptance and Belief Reconsidered," in a volume edited by P. Engel, Belief and Acceptance, to be published by Kluwer in Philosophical Studies Series.
 "Justification, Knowledge and Coherence," to be published in Erkenntnis.
 "Rationality," to be published in Guidebook to Epistemology, Blackwell's, edited by J. Greco and E. Sosa.
 "Individualism versus Communitarianism: A Consensual Compromise," written for a symposium at the World Congress of Philosophy, Boston, August, 1998, and to published in the proceedings.
 "Reid, Hume and Common Sense," to be published in Reid Studies.

 Books edited

 Knowledge, Teaching and Wisdom (Kluwer, forthcoming), with Jeannie Lum, Beverly Slichta and Nicholas Smith
 Austrian Philosophy, Past & Present (Kluwer, in process), with Johann Marek.
 An Opened Curtain: A U.S.-Soviet Philosophical Summit (Westview, 199), with Ernest Sosa
 Knowledge and Skepticism (Westview, 1989), with Marjorie Clay
 Science and Ethics (Rodopi, 1988) Thomas Reid's Inquiry and Essays (Hackett, 1983), with Ronald Beanblossom
 Analysis and Metaphysics: Essays in Honor of R.M. Chisholm (D. Reidel, 1975)
 New Readings in Philosophical Analysis (Appleton-Century-Crofts, 1972), with Herbert Feigl and Wilfrid Sellars
 Theory of Meaning (Prentice Hall, 1970) with Adrienne Lehrer
 Freedom and Determinism (Random House, 1966).

 Books about Keith Lehrer

 Keith Lehrer, edited by Radu Bogdan, Reidel, 1980.
 The Current State of the Coherence Theory: Critical Essays on the Epistemic Theories of Keith Lehrer and Laurence Bonjour, edited by John W. Bender, Kluwer, 1989.
 Metamind, Knowledge, and Coherence: Essays on the Philosophy of Keith Lehrer, edited by Johannes Brandl, Wolfgang Gombocz, and Christian Piller, Rodopi, 1991.
 The Epistemology of Keith Lehrer (Series: Philosophical Studies Series, Vol. 95), edited by Erik J.Olsson, 2003, 364 p., Hardcover.

References

External links
Lehrer's faculty page at the University of Arizona
Lehrer's faculty page at the University of Miami
Lehrer's Painting

1936 births
Living people
American artists
American philosophers
American philosophy academics
Brown University alumni
Epistemologists
University of Arizona faculty
University of Miami faculty
University of Rochester faculty